Larry R. Smith is a poet, fiction writer, literary biographer, translator, essayist and reviewer.

Background
Smith was born in Mingo Junction, Ohio in 1943 and graduated from Mingo High School in 1961, Muskingum College in 1965, then on to Kent State University in Ohio for a masters and doctorate in American and Contemporary World Literature. His thesis work was on Sherwood Anderson and dissertation on Kenneth Patchen, fellow Ohio writers. He has taught at Bowling Green State University's Firelands College since 1970. The author has received an Ohio Arts Council Writing Fellowship and an Ohioana Citation for his contribution to poetry in Ohio. He also has received a National Endowment for the Humanities summer grant and a Fulbright Teaching Lectureship to Italy.

Smith is married to Ann Smith also of Mingo Junction, a professor of nursing at the Medical College of Ohio. Together with her and others they founded Converging Paths Meditation Center in Sandusky, Ohio. Smith is the director of The Firelands Writing Center and of Bottom Dog Press.

Books
Lake Winds: Poems. Bottom Dog Press 2014
Each Moment All. March Street Press/ Bottom Dog Press 2012
The Free Farm: A Novel. Bottom Dog Press 2012 
Mingo Junction. Arcadia Publishing 2011
Tu Fu Comes to America: A Story in Poems. March Street Press 2010
The Long River Home: A Novel. Working Lives Series, Bottom Dog Press 2009
The Kanshi Poems of Taigu Ryokan, trans. by Larry Smith and Mei Hui Liu Huang. Bottom Dog Press 2008.
Faces and Voices: Tales. Bird Dog Publishing 2006.
A River Remains: Poems. WordTech Publishing 2006.
Milldust & Roses: Memoirs. Ridgeway Press 2005; second edition Bottom Dog Press 2005.
Thoreau's Lost Journal: Poems by Larry Smith. Westron Press, 2001.
Kenneth Patchen: Rebel Poet in America. A Consortium of  Small Presses, 2000/ Rev. 2012.    Biography.
Chinese Zen Poems: What Hold Has This Mountain? trans. Bottom Dog Press, 1998.
Working It Out (novel) Ridgeway Press, 1998.
Beyond Rust: Novella and Stories. Bottom Dog Press, 1995.
Steel Valley: Postcards and Letters (Poems). Pig Iron Press, 1992.
Ohio Zen Poems with D. Steven Conkle (A Twinbook) Bottom Dog Press, 1989.
Across These States (Journal Poem) Bottom Dog Press, 1985.
Scissors, Paper, Rock (Prose Poems) Cleveland State University Poetry Center, 1982.
Echo Without Sound (Poems with Etchings by Stephen Smigocki) Northwoods Press, 1982.
Lawrence Ferlinghetti: Poet-at-Large (Literary biography) Southern Illinois University Press, 1983.
Kenneth Patchen (Literary biography) Twayne Series, G.K.Hall Publishers, 1978

Films
Two docu-drama video programs, written, co-directed and co-produced with Tom Koba; funded through Ohio Humanities Council and Ohio Arts Council:
James Wright's Ohio (30 minutes, 1986–1987)
Kenneth Patchen: An Art of Engagement (30 and 45 minutes, 1987–1988)
DVD double program: d.a.levy: Cleveland Rebel Poet of the Mimeograph Revolution (Interview with Ed Sanders/ Memorial Reading at levyfest 2005).

External links
Larry Smith, homepage
Poets and Writers' Directory
Ohio Arts Council Directory of Authors
Review page, New York Journal of Books.
Bottom Dog Press 
Ohio Arts Council Directory with Resume of Writer
Red Room for Authors Larry Smith

Writers from Ohio
People from Mingo Junction, Ohio
Living people
1943 births
Kent State University alumni